Giovanni Remo Fornasini (23 February 1915, in Pianaccio – 13 October 1944, in San Martino di Caprara) was an Italian Roman Catholic priest, resistance member and patriot in Bologna. He was murdered by a German Nazi Waffen SS soldier and was posthumously awarded Italy's Gold Medal of Military Valour. He is being investigated by the Catholic Church towards his possible canonisation. His beatification was celebrated in Bologna on 26 September 2021.

Biography

An editorial comment on the sources
The sources are fragmentary. None gives a complete account of Fornasini's life. Although they are broadly consistent, they sometimes differ in detail. Where they disagree, their varying accounts are set out below as numbered alternatives.

Early years
Fornasini was born in Pianaccio, a frazione of the Italian comune Lizzano in Belvedere, in the then Province of Bologna, Kingdom of Italy. His parents were Angelo ( Anselmo) Fornasini (1887-1938), a charcoal burner, and his wife Maria  Guccini (1887-1951). He had an elder brother, Luigi (born 1912). In 1924 or 1925, the family relocated to Porretta Terme, Bologna. Angelo had been gassed in World War I, and could no longer carry on his trade; instead, he became a postman, delivering letters. Maria got a job as an attendant at a thermal bath in the town. Giovanni studied at Collegio Albergati in Porretta Terme but did not graduate, and is recorded as not having been a good student. After leaving school, he worked for some time as a lift boy in the Grand Hotel, Bologna.

In 1931, he entered the seminary of Borgo Capanne. That seminary closed in 1932, and he transferred to the Archepiscopal Seminary of Bologna at Villa Revedin, and later to the Pontifical Seminary of the Region of Bologna. On 2 February 1934 he made his priestly vow. He continued his theology studies and on 29 March 1940 he was ordained subdeacon and on 7 June 1941 deacon, On 28 June 1942 he was ordained a priest by Cardinal Giovanni Nasalli Rocca di Corneliano, in San Petronio Basilica, Bologna. When made a subdeacon, he was appointed assistant to Don Giovanni Roda, parish priest of Sperticano, a frazione of Marzabotto, Bologna, a parish of about 400 people. His first assignment as a priest was as assistant priest in Sperticano. He celebrated his first Masses at Pianaccio, San Luca, and Porretta; He celebrated his first solemn Mass on 12 July 1942 in the church of San Tommaso a Sperticano. In his homily at Porretta or at Sperticano he said, "The Lord has chosen me to be an urchin among the urchins".

Parish priest
Don Giovanni Roda was elderly, and following his death in August 1942 Fornasini was installed as parish priest in Sperticano on 27 September. His pastoral work began during a turbulent time for Italy during World War II. He opened a school similar to the one he had attended as a boy in Porretta. He also soon gained a reputation as a man of action. Don Angelo Serra, another parish priest in Bologna, said that the parish of Sperticano was transformed by Fornasini's zeal. Don Lino Cattoi, who had been his fellow student, said of his time in Sperticano, "I cannot explain the life he led there: he seemed always to be running. He was always around trying to free people from their difficulties, and to solve their problems. He had no fear. He was a man of great faith, and was never shaken".

On 25 July 1943, Italian dictator Mussolini was overthrown. Fornasini ordered his church bells to be rung in celebration.

Bologna was a city of strategic military importance during World War II. It was heavily bombed by the Allies three times during 1943: on 24 July, 25 September and 27 November. On 3 September, the Kingdom of Italy signed an armistice with the Allies; but the north of Italy, including Bologna, was still under German control. Accounts of Fornasini's pastoral activities during that time are incomplete. It has been said that his chief characteristic was that he was everywhere. After at least one of those bombings, he gave shelter to survivors in his rectory. Riding his bicycle, he gave assistance in nearby parishes, including San Cristoforo di Vedegheto, whose priest had left for health reasons. After the bombing of Reno neighborhood of Bologna on 27 November, he was to be seen everywhere, smiling and comforting people in distress. Serra said: "On the sad day of 27 November 1943, when 46 of my parishioners were killed in Lama di Reno by Allied bombs, I remember Don Giovanni working as hard in the rubble with his pickaxe as if he had been trying to rescue his own mother".

Several sources say that he had some sort of connection with Italian partisans who were fighting the Nazis.

Accounts of the last few months of his life differ in detail. (1) On 24 June 1944, he gave Christian burial to the four or five murdered victims of the Nazi atrocity of 22 June at the station of Pian di Venola, Marzabotto, even though the Nazis had ordered that no such ceremony take place; and he delivered a moving eulogy. At some later date, partisans blew up a train in a railway tunnel near Misa, and the Nazis took Italian civilians as hostages. On 30 July, Fornasini intervened to secure their release. In August, he was again at Pian di Venola, this time offering his own person in exchange for captives of the Nazis. In September, he and Don Gabriele Bonani helped three British prisoners to escape. He was arrested at Pioppe di Salvaro. On 5 September, he buried the dead at Ca' di Biguzzi. On 8 September, the Nazis garrisoned troops in his rectory. The same day, he wrote his last will and testament. (2) He wrote his last will and testament on 10 September. (3) In July 1944, the Germans took 30 Italian civilians prisoner at Pioppe di Salvaro. He intervened, offering his own person in exchange. The Germans murdered only 12 of them. On 30 July, a train loaded with fuel blew up. Two German soldiers died, and the Germans took 20 Italians as hostages. He gathered evidence which persuaded the Germans that the explosion had been an accident and the hostages were released. He then convinced the Germans that several other acts of sabotage had been committed by Tuscan partisans, and that local people had not been involved. This saved many lives. He did not manage to intervene before the massacre at Corsaglia (Marzabotto), the place where he later lost his own life. (4) According to Don Angelo, Fornasini persuaded the German commander to rescind his order to lay waste to Marzabotto by the gift of money and a pig.

On 12 October, he intervened to protect one or more women who were being abused by one or more Germans. (1) An SS officer had designs on one of the girls sheltered in Fornasini's rectory. Fornasini was forced to attend a squalid German party to celebrate her birthday where, despite insults and mockery, he protected her. (2) Two young women were being abused by several SS soldiers. He made them desist. (3) A Nazi official tried to drag a girl away, but Fornasini faced him down.

Death and burial
The best contemporary account may be in the diary of Don Amadeo Girotti (1881/82-1974), parish priest of San Michele Arcangelo di Montasico in Bologna. He knew Fornasini well: he had made confession to him at least twice, and shortly after the murder called him "Don Fornasini, dearest to me".

Between 29 September and 5 October 1944, Waffen SS troops killed an estimated 770 Italian civilians at the village of Marzabotto, an event known as the Marzabotto massacre. Don Ubaldo Marchioni was among the first victims, murdered in Marzabotto on 29 September.

Fornasini died on 13 October 1944. The circumstances of his death are shrouded in mystery. (1) On 18 May 1945, Don Amadeo said that a Nazi officer had given Fornasini permission to bury the dead at San Martino del Sole, Marzabotto, on 13 October 1944, but that he had been cynically murdered there; that his body was identified on 14 October; and that he had been shot in the chest. (Don Amadeo had learned of the death on 18 October 1944.) (2) On 13 October, Fornasini followed the Germans to Caprara. (3) While burying the dead at Casaglia di Caprara, which the Nazis had forbidden, he accused a Nazi officer of complicity in the Marzabotto massacre, and was at once shot down. (4) He accused an officer in the 16th SS Panzergrenadier Division Reichsführer-SS of complicity in the Marzabotto massacre. He was shot at point-blank range and decapitated. (5) He accused a German officer of being responsible for the massacre. The officer replied, that that was a lie, and invited Fornasini to inspect Marzabotto, where he shot him in the head, among all the other corpses there.

His remains were recovered in the spring after the Nazi withdrawal from Italy. (1) On 21 April 1945, Luigi recovered the body of his brother Giovanni, and some days later gave it makeshift burial at Sperticano. (2) Luigi discovered the body of his brother on 22 April. (3) The body had been decapitated. (4) That temporary burial took place on 24 April. (5) All sources agree that on 13 October 1945, Fornasini was given Christian burial in his own church of San Tommaso a Sperticano.

Posthumous recognition
On 19 May 1950, the President of Italy, Luigi Einaudi, conferred upon Fornasini posthumously Italy's Gold Medal of Military Valour. The award was presented to his mother, Maria, on 2 June 1951. The citation reads:

An elementary school in Porretta Terme, Scuola Primaria "Don Giovanni Fornasini", is named in his honour. A street in Bologna, Via Don Giovanni Fornasini, commemorates his name; as do other places in the Province of Bologna.

Fornasini has been called "the angel of Marzabotto" and one of "the three martyrs of Monte Sole" along with his murdered fellow priests Ferdinando Casagrande and Ubaldo Marchioni.

On 13 October 1978, inhabitants of Marzabotto began to press for official recognition by the Catholic Church of these three priests. On 19 August 1998, the Congregation for the Causes of Saints granted permission for inquiries to be opened into the lives and works of those three priests. On 18 October 1998, in Marzabotto, Cardinal Giacomo Biffi opened formal proceedings for their beatification. Since that day, all three have been entitled to be honoured as Servants of God. On 20 November 2011, Cardinal Carlo Caffarra declared in San Petronio Basilica, Bologna, to a congregation that included civic dignitaries and relatives of the murdered priests that the Archdiocese of Bologna had completed the three investigations, and that their findings would be communicated to the Holy See for further processing.

In the 2009 film The Man Who Will Come, which concerns the Marzabotto massacre, actor Raffaele Zabban portrayed the small role of Fornasini.

In 2014, Italian musician Alessandro Berti created what he called a performance piece that uses spoken narration and vocal and instrumental accompaniment to relate the story of the last year of Fornasini's life. It is called Un cristiano: Don Giovanni Fornasini, l'angelo di Marzabotto, or, Un cristiano: Don Giovanni Fornasini a Monte Sole. It has been performed more than once.

Beatification
On 21 January 2021, Pope Francis authorised the Congregation for the Causes of Saints to issue a beatification decree officially recognising Fornasini's martyrdom. Fornasini was beatified in Bologna on 26 September 2021.

Notes

References

1915 births
1944 deaths
People from the Province of Bologna
People murdered in Emilia-Romagna
Resistance members killed by Nazi Germany
Recipients of the Gold Medal of Military Valor
Italian Servants of God
20th-century Italian Roman Catholic priests
Italian resistance movement members
Beatifications by Pope Francis
Italian beatified people
Venerated Catholics
Italian civilians killed in World War II